The following is a chronological list of Korean classical music composers.

Modern and contemporary
Hyun Jae-Myung (1902–1960)
Ahn Eak-tai (1906–1965)
Isang Yun (1917–1995)
Young-ja Lee (born 1931)
Junsang Bahk (born 1937)
Sook-Ja Oh (born 1941)
Kyungsun Suh (born 1942)
Chan-Hae Lee (born 1945)
Younghi Pagh-Paan (born 1945)
Hi Kyung Kim (born 1954)
Kim Jin-Hi (born 1957)
Lim Jun-Hee (born 1959)
Unsuk Chin (born 1961)
Shinuh Lee (born 1969)
Jeajoon Ryu (born 1970)
Sungji Hong (born 1973)
DaeSeob Han (born 1977)

References

Korea
Korean composers